Krasnogvardeysky District is an administrative and a municipal district (raion), one of the seven in the Republic of Adygea, Russian Federation. It is located in the northwest of the republic and borders with Ust-Labinsky District of Krasnodar Krai in the north, Shovgenovsky District in the east, Belorechensky District of Krasnodar Krai in the south, and with Krasnodar Reservoir in the west. Its borders with Teuchezhsky District (in the west) and Dinskoy District of Krasnodar Krai (in the northwest) pass through the waters of Krasnodar Reservoir. Its administrative center is the rural locality (a selo) of Krasnogvardeyskoye. As of the 2010 Census, the total population of the district was 30,868, with the population of Krasnogvardeyskoye accounting for 30.6% of that number.

History
The district was established on February 7, 1929. It was transformed into a rural district on February 1, 1963, but this was reversed on January 12, 1965. The district has been dealing with mass illegal immigration of ethnic Kurds in recent years.

Administrative and municipal status
Within the framework of administrative divisions, Krasnogvardeysky District is one of the seven in the Republic of Adygea and has administrative jurisdiction over all of its twenty-five rural localities. As a municipal division, the district is incorporated as Krasnogvardeysky Municipal District. Its twenty-five rural localities are incorporated into seven rural settlements within the municipal district. The selo of Krasnogvardeyskoye serves as the administrative center of both the administrative and municipal district.

Municipal composition
Beloselskoye Rural Settlement
Administrative center: selo of Beloye
other localities of the rural settlement:
khutor of Bogursukov
settlement of Mirny
selo of Novosevastopolskoye
khutor of Papenkov
selo of Preobrazhenskoye
Bolshesidorovskoye Rural Settlement
Administrative center: selo of Bolshesidorovskoye
other localities of the rural settlement:
aul of Dzhambichi
Khatukayskoye Rural Settlement
Administrative center: aul of Khatukay
other localities of the rural settlement:
settlement of Lesnoy
settlement of Naberezhny
settlement of Svobodny
settlement of Vodny
Krasnogvardeyskoye Rural Settlement
Administrative center: selo of Krasnogvardeyskoye
other localities of the rural settlement:
aul of Adamy
khutor of Chumakov
Sadovoye Rural Settlement
Administrative center: selo of Sadovoye
other localities of the rural settlement:
aul of Bzhedugkhabl
selo of Verkhnenazarovskoye
Ulyapskoye Rural Settlement
Administrative center: aul of Ulyap
other localities of the rural settlement:
selo of Shturbino
Yelenovskoye Rural Settlement
Administrative center: selo of Yelenovskoye
other localities of the rural settlement:
khutor of Doguzhiyev
khutor of Pustosyolov
khutor of Saratovsky

References

Notes

Sources

Districts of Adygea
 
States and territories established in 1929